The Republic of Fiji Military Forces Band also commonly known as the RFMF Band is a 50 member brass band from the Republic of Fiji Military Forces.

The RFMF Band has been widely known as musical ambassadors for Fiji. The band was established during World War I as the Suva Town Band. It was disbanded following the outbreak of World War II. It was reformed in 1941 as the 1st Battalion Fiji Infantry Regiment band, of which members were in active service in the Solomon Islands.

Between 1968 and 2017, the band was engaged in many performances around the world including the Royal Edinburgh Military Tattoo. In September 1965, it took part in the Royal Marines Tattoo at Madison Square Garden, five years before it gained independence from the United Kingdom. In 2016, the band was invited to perform during the Queens 90th birthday celebrations at Windsor Castle. On its 100th anniversary in 2017, a gallery was set up to where people can look at the history of the RFMF band. A ceremonial military tattoo was also held in the presence of President of Fiji Jioji Konrote.

See also
Central Military Band of the People's Liberation Army of China
Indian military bands
New Zealand Army Band

References

Military bands
Fijian musical groups
Band
1917 establishments in Fiji